Alberta Brianti and Sara Errani were the defending champions, but decided not to participate together.

Brianti partnered up with Akgul Amanmuradova, but lost already in the first round to eventual champions Errani and Roberta Vinci. This pair won the tournament, defeating Andrea Hlaváčková and Klára Zakopalová, 7–5, 6–1, in the final.

Seeds

  Sara Errani /  Roberta Vinci (champions)
  Andrea Hlaváčková /  Klára Zakopalová (final)
  Maria Kondratieva /  Sophie Lefèvre (semifinals)
  Sorana Cîrstea /  Andreja Klepač (first round)

Draw

Draw

References
 Main Draw

Internazionali Femminili di Palermo - Doubles
2011 Doubles